Highfield Square, also known as Highfield Square Shopping Centre, was a shopping centre located in Moncton, New Brunswick, Canada. Highfield Square was owned and operated by Crombie REIT before being sold to the city of Moncton.  The complex has since been demolished.

Future

The property has been converted to the Avenir Centre.

History
The mall contained at its peak over 60 stores and services. The major anchor during its lifetime included:
The Bay previously Eatons
Sobeys
The Met
Shoppers Drug Mart

Other prominent tenants included RadioShack, and Reitmans.

After the mall closed its movie theatres in the 1970s, it converted the area into a large food court with many restaurants, such as Pizza Delight, A&W, Deluxe, Tim Hortons, and Ed's Sub. The mall mascot was Hifie the Bear.

See also
List of shopping malls in Canada

References

Defunct shopping malls in Canada
Buildings and structures in Moncton
Defunct companies of New Brunswick